Diospyros major, or the Fiji persimmon, is a tree in the family Ebenaceae that is native to Fiji, Tonga, Uvea, and Futuna. It is called 'mapa in the Tongan language.

References

major
Trees of Fiji